The 2014 Portuguese Social Democratic Party leadership election was held on 25 January 2014. Then PSD leader and Prime Minister Pedro Passos Coelho ran for a 3rd term as party leader and was the sole candidate in the race, thus winning with almost 90% of the votes.

Candidates

Results

See also
 Social Democratic Party (Portugal)
 List of political parties in Portugal
 Elections in Portugal

References

External links
PSD Official Website

2014 in Portugal
Political party leadership elections in Portugal
2014 elections in Portugal
Portuguese Social Democratic Party leadership election